Cal Smid is a South African rugby union player for the  in the Currie Cup. His regular position is loose forward.

Smid was named in the  side for the 2022 Currie Cup Premier Division.

References

South African rugby union players
Living people
Rugby union flankers
Rugby union number eights
Tel Aviv Heat players
South African expatriate sportspeople in Israel
South African expatriate rugby union players
Expatriate rugby union players in Israel
Golden Lions players
Year of birth missing (living people)
Lions (United Rugby Championship) players